Martina Navratilova and Pam Shriver were the defending champions but lost in the final 6–7(5–7), 6–2, 6–3 against Claudia Kohde-Kilsch and Helena Suková.

Seeds 
Champion seeds are indicated in bold text while text in italics indicates the round in which those seeds were eliminated.

Draw

Finals

Top half

Section 1

Section 2

Bottom half

Section 3

Section 4

External links 
1985 US Open – Women's draws and results at the International Tennis Federation

Women's Doubles
US Open (tennis) by year – Women's doubles
1985 in women's tennis
1985 in American women's sports